Loosier is an unincorporated community in Lawrence County, Alabama, United States. Loosier is presented on the Masterson Mill U.S. Geological Survey Map.

It is at elevation 228m.

History
A post office operated under the name Loosier from 1901 to 1902. The town was founded between 1860-1870 by Civil War Veteran Thomas Jefferson Loosier. In 1917 the town had 1 Grain Mill, 1 Saw Mill, 2 Churches, 1 School, 1 Store, and 1 Post Office

References

Unincorporated communities in Lawrence County, Alabama
Unincorporated communities in Alabama